Teratophoneus ("monstrous murderer"; Greek: teras, "monster" and phoneus, "murderer") is a genus of tyrannosaurid dinosaur which lived during the late Cretaceous period (late Campanian age, about 77 to 76 million years ago) in what is now Utah, United States, containing a single known species, T. curriei. It is known from an incomplete skull and postcranial skeleton recovered from the Kaiparowits Formation. It was specifically named T. curriei in honor of Philip J. Currie.

Discovery and naming

Fossils of Teratophoneus were first found in the Kaiparowits Formation of southern Utah. Later, fossils from the same formation were discovered and identified as the genus. Argon-argon radiometric dating indicates that the Kaiparowits Formation was deposited between 76.1 and 74.0 million years ago, during the Campanian stage of the Late Cretaceous period. This date means that Teratophoneus lived in the middle of the Campanian stage of the Late Cretaceous. 

Several fossils of Teratophoneus have been found. Originally, Teratophoneus was described based on the holotype BYU 8120. More recently, the specimens UMNH VP 16690 and UMNP VP 16691 have been assigned to it. In 2017, a new specimen of Teratophoneus was discovered in the Grand Staircase-Escalante National Monument and airlifted to the Natural History Museum of Utah in Salt Lake City. Later, in 2021, fossils belonging to 4 or 5 individuals were described in the same study.

Teratophoneus was named by Thomas D. Carr, Thomas E. Williamson, Brooks B. Britt and Ken Stadtman in 2011. The type and only species was named T. curriei. The generic name is derived from the Greek teras, "monster", and phoneus, "murderer." The specific name honors Philip J. Currie.

Description

The holotype of Teratophoneus consists of a fragmentary skull and parts of the postcranial skeleton. The fossils were originally assigned to four different individuals, but are probably only of a single subadult animal. However this is likely an underestimate.

The skull of Teratophoneus is also comparably deeper. It is unclear if there was a specific reason for these differences, but the extra depth may have allowed for stronger jaw muscles, increasing the bite force of Teratophoneus.

Classification
Loewen et al. (2013) conducted a phylogenetic analysis of the family Tyrannosauridae, and confirmed the assignment of Teratophoneus to the tyrannosaurid sub-family Tyrannosaurinae. They concluded that Teratophoneus was closely related to both Tarbosaurus and Tyrannosaurus, but placed in a more basal position within the family, though more derived than Daspletosaurus.

Below is the cladogram based on the phylogenetic analysis conducted by Loewen et al. in 2013.

In 2020, when describing the genus Thanatotheristes, Voris et al., 2020 found Teratophoneus to be in a subclade alongside Dynamoterror and Lythronax. The clade remains unnamed.

Paleobiology

Social Behavior 

A bone bed of fossils from the Rainbows and Unicorns Quarry in Southern Utah's Kaiparowits Formation described in 2021 attributed to Teratophoneus suggests that the genus was a social pack-hunter. The fossils, consisting of four or possibly five animals ranging from 4-22 years of age, suggest a mass mortality event, possibly caused by flooding, or less likely by cyanobacterial toxicosis, fire or drought. The fact that all of the animals preserved died within a short time period further strengthens the argument for gregarious behavior in tyrannosaurids, with bone beds of Teratophoneus, Albertosaurus, and Daspletosaurus showcasing the potential behavior may have been widespread amongst tyrannosaurs in general.

Paleoecology

The holotype of Teratophoneus were recovered at the Kaiparowits Formation, in southern Utah. Argon-argon radiometric dating indicates that the fossils were buried during the Campanian stage of the Late Cretaceous period. During the Late Cretaceous period, the site within the Kaiparowits Formation was located on Laramidia near its eastern shore on the Western Interior Seaway, a large inland sea that split North America into two landmasses, the other being Appalachia to the east. The plateau where dinosaurs lived was an ancient floodplain dominated by large channels and an abundance of wetland peat swamps, ponds and lakes, and was bordered by highlands. The climate was wet and humid, and supported an array of different and diverse groups of organisms. This formation contains one of the best and most continuous records of Late Cretaceous terrestrial life in the world.

Teratophoneus curriei shared its paleoenvironment with  theropods such as dromaeosaurids, the troodontid Talos sampsoni,  ornithomimids like Ornithomimus velox, the ankylosaur Akainacephalus Johnsoni, the duckbilled hadrosaurs Parasaurolophus cyrtocristatus and Gryposaurus monumentensis, the ceratopsians Utahceratops gettyi, Nasutoceratops titusi, and Kosmoceratops richardsoni, as well as the oviraptorosaurian Hagryphus giganteus.
Paleofauna present in the Kaiparowits Formation included chondrichthyans (sharks and rays), frogs, salamanders, turtles, lizards, and crocodilians.  A variety of early mammals were present including multituberculates, marsupials, and insectivorans.

See also

 Timeline of tyrannosaur research

References

Tyrannosaurids
Monotypic dinosaur genera
Campanian life
Late Cretaceous dinosaurs of North America
Paleontology in Utah
Kaiparowits Formation
Fossil taxa described in 2011